DADLE ([D-Ala2, D-Leu5]-Enkephalin) is a synthetic opioid peptide with analgesic properties. Although it is often considered a selective delta opioid receptor agonist, it also binds to the μ1 subtype of mu opioid receptors. 

Treatment with DADLE results in transient depression of mean arterial blood pressure and heart rate.

Its peptide sequence is Tyr-D-Ala-Gly-Phe-D-Leu.

See also
 DAMGO
 DPDPE

References

Synthetic opioids
Opioid peptides
Mu-opioid receptor agonists
Delta-opioid receptor agonists